Gerhard Unterluggauer (born August 15, 1976) is an Austrian former professional ice hockey defenceman who Captained EC VSV in the Austrian Hockey League (EBEL).  He participated at the 2011 IIHF World Championship as a member of the Austria men's national ice hockey team. He also competed at the 1998 Winter Olympics, the 2002 Winter Olympics and the 2014 Winter Olympics.

Career statistics

Regular season and playoffs

International

References

External links

1976 births
Austrian ice hockey defencemen
EC VSV players
Living people
Sportspeople from Villach
Brandon Wheat Kings players
Schwenninger Wild Wings players
DEG Metro Stars players
HC TWK Innsbruck players
Ice hockey players at the 1998 Winter Olympics
Ice hockey players at the 2002 Winter Olympics
Ice hockey players at the 2014 Winter Olympics
Olympic ice hockey players of Austria
Austrian expatriate ice hockey people
Austrian expatriate sportspeople in Canada